Acedianthrone is an octacyclic relative of anthraquinone that is used as a pigment.  It is produced from anthrone by condensation with glyoxal followed by dehydrogenation.

References

Anthraquinone dyes